Crown Investments Corporation (commonly known as CIC) is the holding company used by the Government of Saskatchewan to manage its financial and commercial Crown Corporations as well as its minority holdings in private-sector ventures.

History

CIC started out as the Government Finance Office (GFO) in 1947. Its job was to manage, direct investment, and return dividends of various commercial Crown corporations to the Government. The profits from the Crown corporations were reinvested or given back to the government. The GFO was also used to invest government money in various Crowns.

In 1978, the name was changed to Crown Investment Corporation.

References

External links
Crown Investment Corporation of Saskatchewan

Crown corporations of Saskatchewan
Sovereign wealth funds
Economy of Saskatchewan
Investment in Canada